The 2003 Democratic Progressive Party presidential primary was the selection process by which the Democratic Progressive Party of the Republic of China (Taiwan) chose its candidate for the 2004 presidential election. The DPP candidate for president was not selected because only one person, the incumbent President Chen Shui-bian, wanted to take the ticket.

Result

See also
 2004 Republic of China presidential election

Democratic Progressive Party presidential primary
Democratic Progressive Party
Primary elections in Taiwan